Royal Air Force Hope Cove or more simply RAF Hope Cove is a former Royal Air Force radar station.

Hope Cove was originally built in 1941 to host an AMES Type 7 ground control interception (GCI) station. In the 1950s it joined the ROTOR network and was upgraded with an AMES Type 80 radar. It was one of six Type 80 stations that featured a R6 bunker, which was semi-sunken.

When the GCI role was moved to the new Master Radar Stations, the bunker was made redundant and taken over by the Home Office as a regional seat of government (RSG) bunker. Plans to move this station to Norton Manor Camp were never carried out, and it remained in use as a RSG (although the name change on occasion) until 1994 with the ending of the Cold War.

The bunker is currently a Grade II Listed Building.

References

Royal Air Force stations in Devon
Royal Air Force stations of World War II in the United Kingdom
Radar stations